The following is a list of pipeline accidents in the United States in 2006. It is one of several lists of U.S. pipeline accidents. See also list of natural gas and oil production accidents in the United States.

Incidents 

This is not a complete list of all pipeline accidents. For natural gas alone, the Pipeline and Hazardous Materials Safety Administration (PHMSA), a United States Department of Transportation agency, has collected data on more than 3,200 accidents deemed serious or significant since 1987.

A "significant incident" results in any of the following consequences:
 fatality or injury requiring in-patient hospitalization
 $50,000 or more in total costs, measured in 1984 dollars
 liquid releases of five or more barrels (42 US gal/barrel)
 releases resulting in an unintentional fire or explosion

PHMSA and the National Transportation Safety Board (NTSB) post incident data and results of investigations into accidents involving pipelines that carry a variety of products, including natural gas, oil, diesel fuel, gasoline, kerosene, jet fuel, carbon dioxide, and other substances. Occasionally pipelines are repurposed to carry different products.

 On January 13, a pipeline leak near Independence, Kansas spilled about 135,000 gallons of petroleum product, of which about 93,000 gallons was lost. The pipeline failed from external corrosion.
 On February 28, a gas compressor station explosion severely burned a worker, and set off a raging fire near De Beque, Colorado. A second explosion at that site soon after caused no injuries.
 The Prudhoe Bay oil spill: On March 2, a surveillance crew discovered a crude oil spill from a BP crude pipeline near North Slope Borough, Alaska. The pipeline's leak detection system was not effective in recognizing and identifying the failure. Failure to run cleaning pigs to remove internal corrosive build up was a factor. The failure caused crude oil prices to spike throughout the World.
During the repair work, another smaller nearby leak was also found.
 On April 17, a Plantation Pipeline line experienced a failure in Henrico County, near Richmond, Virginia. The failure resulted in the release of 23,226 gallons of jet fuel in a residential area. The jet fuel did not ignite.
 On June 19, a 12 inch Sunoco pipeline failed at a tank farm, in Tye, Texas, spilling about 21,000 gallons of crude oil. The cause was internal corrosion.
 On June 27, a Koch Industries pipeline carrying crude oil failed, near the town of Little Falls, Minnesota. The pipeline failed due to previous mechanical damage to it.
The gas ignited, but there were no injuries, and just minor property damage. External corrosion was suspected.
 On July 22, 2006, near Campbellsville, Kentucky, a Kinder Morgan Tennessee Gas Pipeline exploded. A 25-foot-long piece of pipe blew out of the ground and landed 200 feet away; the pipe wad twisted and mangled, its external coating burned off. The 24" pipeline ruptured due to an area of external bacterial corrosion more than two feet long at the bottom of a valley in an area of wet shale, known to cause corrosion on buried pipelines in this part of Kentucky. The pipe was manufactured in 1944.
 On August 7, a leak from a pump on a pipeline, released about 241,000 gallons of HVL's, in Jennings, Louisiana.
 On August 12, a Kinder Morgan petroleum pipeline failed in Romeoville, Illinois. About  of butane were lost. External corrosion was the cause, but there were no injuries.
 On September 8, a leak on a pump on an LPG pipeline in Apex, North Carolina spilled about 12,000 gallons of propane, forcing evacuations.
 On September 29, a crew replacing an old pipeline hit a high pressure gas pipeline in Labette County, Kansas, killing a crewman. Residents within a mile of the incident were evacuated for a time.
Four crew members were killed, and two were missing and later presumed dead.
 On October 25, an ammonia pipeline failed from corrosion near Clay Center, Kansas, releasing about 4500 barrels of ammonia. Two people were injured by the fumes.
 On November 11, 2006, near Cheyenne, Wyoming, a jet-black,  burn site surrounded the skeletal hulk of a bulldozer that struck the Rockies Express (REX) natural-gas pipeline, setting off an explosion and fire. The bulldozer operator was killed. The subcontractor did not know there was another pipeline there because no one had marked the position of the existing pipeline. The company building the new pipeline was fined $2.3 million for failing to obtain a location for the other pipeline. Two months after this explosion, the Federal Energy Regulatory Commission threatened to shut the project down if REX didn’t improve its “poor compliance record” involving construction activity outside the approved work area.
 On or about November 27, 2006, approximately 97 barrels of gasoline were discharged from a portion of Plantation Pipeline in Mecklenburg County, North Carolina, into Paw Creek and its adjoining shorelines. The leak resulted from a failed gasket on an above-ground block valve.
 2006 Falk Corporation explosion: Leaks in a Milwaukee, Wisconsin propane pipe running below an apartment building caused an explosion. Three people were killed and forty-seven others injured.
 On December 19, a lineman for Midwest Energy hit a natural gas transmission pipeline near Mason, Michigan. The lineman was killed in the following explosion and fire.
 On December 24, a Plains All American Pipeline ruptured, spilling about 23,856 gallons of crude oil in the Gulf of Mexico, about 30 miles southeast of Galveston, Texas.

References 

Lists of pipeline accidents in the United States
2006 disasters in the United States